Cossonini is a weevil tribe in the subfamily Cossoninae.

Genera 
Afrocossonus - Brachychaenus - Coprodema - Cossonus - Deinocossonus - Dynatopechas - Exodema - Exomesites - Exonotus - Gloeodema - Gloeotrogus - Gloeoxenus - Hemigleodema - Heteramphus - Heterophaseolus - Homalotrogus - Hoplocossonus - Kojimazo - Lasiotrupis - Leurostenus - Lissopsis - Macrocordylus - Marvaldiella - Megalocorynus - Melarhinus - Mesites - Mesitinus - Mesostenotrupis - Microhimatium - Micromesites - Oxydema - Pachytrogus - Pentamimus - Phloeophagoides - Pholidoforus - Procossonus - Pseadomesites - Pseudocossonus - Psilotrogus - Rhopalomesites - Rhyncolosoma - Rhypax - Seenomma - Sphaerocorynes - Stenotrupis - Stereoborus - Stereomimetes - Stereonotus - Stereotribus - Syncoxus - Tetracoptus - Tetragonorrhamphus - Vauriellina - Xestoderma

References 

 Schönherr, C.J. 1825: Continuatio Tabulae synopticae Familiae Curculionidum. Isis von Oken, 1825 (5): c. 581–588
 Omar, J.M. ; R. Zhang & S.R. Davis 2007: On the Genus Stereoborus Wollaston (Coleoptera: Curculionidae: Cossoninae) with Description of a New Species from China. The Coleopterists Bulletin 61 (2): 200–207.

External links 

 faunaeur.org

Cossoninae
Beetles described in 1825
Beetles of Asia
Beetle tribes